Amao may refer to:

People

Surname
 Adewale Amao (born 1990), Nigerian male professional squash player
 Ibilola Amao, Nigerian engineer
 Isiaka Oladayo Amao (born 1965), Chief of Air Staff of the Nigerian Air Force
 Yoshi Amao, Japanese actor, comedian, emcee, and martial artist

Given name
 Amao Leota Lu (born 1971), Samoan performance artist, poetm and community activist